Ludvig Albert Hegner (1 May 1851 – 7 November 1923) was a Danish composer.

See also
List of Danish composers

References
This article was initially translated from the Danish Wikipedia.

Danish composers
Male composers
1851 births
1923 deaths